Posta Ybycua is a division (compañía) of the city Capiatá in Central Department, Paraguay.

Populated places in the Central Department